Jin-ni (Jin No. 2) Dam is a gravity dam located in Toyama prefecture in Japan. The dam is used for power production. The catchment area of the dam is 2060 km2. The dam impounds about 67  ha of land when full and can store 8663 thousand cubic meters of water. The construction of the dam was started on 1952 and completed in 1953.

References

Dams in Toyama Prefecture
1953 establishments in Japan